Selda is a Turkish feminine given name.

People
Selda, Selda Bağcan (born 1948), Turkish singer, guitarist, and music producer
Selda Alkor (born 1943), Turkish actress, beauty pageant titleholder, painter, and singer
Selda Akgöz (born 1993), Turkish footballer
Selda Gunsel, Turkish American mechanical engineer

Turkish feminine given names